Muhamad Syazwan bin Zaipol Bahari (born 24 February 1995) is a Malaysian professional footballer who plays as centre-back for Malaysia Super League club Kelantan United and the Malaysia U-23 national team.

Club career

Perak
On 6 December 2017, it has been confirmed that Syazwan will play for Malaysia Super League club Perak for upcoming 2018 Malaysia Super League season.

On 11 March 2018, Syazwan made his debut for Perak coming off the bench in a 3–0 win over Selangor at Naval Base Stadium.

Career statistics

Club

Honours

International
Malaysia U-23
Southeast Asian Games
 Silver Medal: 2017

References

External links
 

1995 births
Living people
Malaysian footballers
Perak F.C. players
Petaling Jaya City FC players
Penang F.C. players
Malaysian people of Malay descent
Southeast Asian Games silver medalists for Malaysia
Southeast Asian Games medalists in football
Association football central defenders
Footballers at the 2018 Asian Games
Competitors at the 2017 Southeast Asian Games
Asian Games competitors for Malaysia